Chou Kuei-yu (born July 19, 1998 in Taipei City, Taiwan) is a Taiwanese professional basketball player for the Taipei Fubon Braves of the P. LEAGUE+ and ASEAN Basketball League.

College career

Professional career

Taipei Fubon Braves

First season 
On May 26, 2020, Chou was signed with the Taipei Fubon Braves after graduating from National Taiwan Normal University. Chou's debut on January 17, 2020 when Taipei Fubon Braves against Hsinchu JKO Lioneers.

National team career 
Chou's first experience with the Chinese Taipei men's national basketball team came at the 2018 William Jones Cup, where he helped team defeat Lithuania for the first time.

Career statistics

P. LEAGUE+

Regular season

College

Awards and honors

References 

1998 births
Taiwanese men's basketball players
Living people
Taipei Fubon Braves players
National Taiwan Normal University alumni
Chinese Taipei men's national basketball team players
P. League+ players
21st-century Taiwanese people